Corin Hardy (born 6 January 1975) is an English film director. He made his directorial debut with the 2015 horror film The Hallow, which he also co-wrote.

He directed the 2018 horror film The Nun, a spin-off of The Conjuring 2 (2016) and the fifth film in The Conjuring Universe.

In 2020, he directed four episodes of the first season of Gangs of London, a TV series produced for Sky Atlantic.

Early career
Hardy first started as a special effects "monster-maker" in his bike shed at the age of 12, and made Super 8 films with his school friends.

Filmography
Short film

Feature film

Television

References

External links

Alumni of Wimbledon College of Arts
English film directors
Horror film directors
Living people
1975 births
English music video directors